The VCA-155 (Vehículo de combate de Artillería, Artillery Combat Vehicle) is a self-propelled 155mm gun/howitzer, manufactured by TAMSE (Tanque Argentino Mediano Sociedad del Estado) which entered service in the late 1990s.

Description 
It uses a TAP chassis (Tanque Argentino Pesado, Argentine Heavy Tank), an abandoned project derived from the TAM (Tanque Argentino Mediano, Argentine Medium Tank). It weighs 40 tonnes, and has 7 rolling wheels.

It has a 155-mm howitzer "Palmaria" turret of Italian origin. It has a vehicular communications equipment SEM 180 and 193, which allows voice communication (within and outside the vehicle), but also operates in digital form.

In total, 17 units were built.

Usage 

In conjunction with the VCCDT (Vehiculo de Combate Centro de Direccion de Tiro - Combat Vehicle, Fire Control Centre) it makes up a modern system of artillery weapons. It also operates an integrated system for artillery fire campaign called "TRUENO", which enables it to direct artillery fire in an automated mode.

See also 
 List of artillery by country
 TAM (tank)
 Palmaria (artillery)
 OF-40

References

Notes

Bibliography

Further reading 
 

Self-propelled artillery of Argentina
Armoured fighting vehicles of Argentina
155 mm artillery
Tracked self-propelled howitzers
Military vehicles introduced in the 1990s